Let My People Go: Bible Stories Told by a Freeman of Color is a 1998 book by Patricia McKissack. Set in 19th century South Carolina, it is about a freed slave, Price Jeffries, who uses Bible stories from the Old Testament to answer questions that his daughter, Charlotte, poses about the things she sees around her.

Reception
Booklist, in its review of Let My People Go, called it "stirring" and concluded, "With the rhythm and intimacy of the oral tradition, this is storytelling for family and group sharing and also for talking about history and our connections with the universals of the Old Testament." and School Library Journal found it "A masterful combination of Bible stories and African-American history."

Let My People Go has also been reviewed by Publishers Weekly, The Horn Book Magazine. Library Media Connection, Multicultural Review, and Parenting.

Awards
1998 Capital Choices Noteworthy Book for Children and Teens
1998 CCBC Choice
2000 Anne Izard Storytellers' Award - winner

References

1998 children's books
American children's novels
Children's historical novels
Novels based on the Bible
Novels set in the 19th century
Novels set in South Carolina
Christian children's books
Books by Patricia McKissack
1998 American novels
Atheneum Books books